Tasesa James Lavea (born 10 January 1980) is a New Zealand rugby union coach and former professional rugby league and rugby union footballer. He is of Samoan and Māori descent and heritage, and he coaches the 1st XV for Saint Kentigern College.

Early life 
Although born in Taihape, Lavea grew up in Auckland and was educated at Papatoetoe High School, then St Kentigern College where he played for three seasons in the 1st XV. He was an age-group representative between the ages of 14 and 16, and played for both the Auckland and New Zealand Secondary Schools teams in 1998. He also excelled in cricket.

Career
Lavea played fly-half for the Blues in Super Rugby from 2004 to 2006. He also played at inside centre for the Chiefs in the 2007 and 2008 seasons. In 2009 he rejoined the Blues.

At provincial level, Lavea played for Auckland in the National Provincial Championship from 2003 through to 2007. He joined Counties Manukau in 2008.

He played for French Top 14 team ASM Clermont Auvergne between 2009 and 2011.

Switch to Rugby League 
Following secondary school, Lavea played for the Junior All Blacks and was then scouted by Melbourne Storm (despite never having played rugby league until signing), switching codes to play in Australia. Having won the 1999 Premiership, the Melbourne Storm travelled to England to contest the 2000 World Club Challenge against Super League Champions St Helens R.F.C., with Lavea playing from the interchange bench in the victory. Thanks to his prodigious goal-kicking skills, in 2000 he was the Melbourne Storm's leading points scorer (190 points) and was named the NRL Rookie of the Year.

After a quieter second season, in 2002 Lavea left Melbourne for the Northern Eagles but was hampered by injury and hardly featured in the team.

Test Matches and Rugby League World Cup
Lavea was a member of New Zealand's 2000 World Cup squad. Between 2000 and 2001, he played 4 test matches for the Kiwis in his usual rugby league position of stand-off. In the match against Cook Islands on 2 November 2000, Lavea's haul of 32 points (2 tries and 12 goals) broke the previous Kiwi record of 26 points (set by Henry Paul).

Return to Rugby Union 
Lavea returned to New Zealand in 2003 and switched codes once again to play rugby union, signing with Auckland. His NPC debut was in that year, against Waikato. He then made his Blues debut in 2004 against the Reds and was part of the Blues for three seasons. In 2007 Lavea joined the Chiefs through the player draft, with whom he played two seasons, and in 2008 moved provinces from Auckland to Counties. In 2009 he returned to the Blues, however he made only four more appearances for the side in his final season of Super Rugby. He played a final season for Counties in the Air New Zealand Cup before moving to France.

2006 Rugby season 
Following a mixed Super 14 season in 2006, Lavea was named in the New Zealand Māori rugby union team. Due to an injury sustained in club rugby, he had to withdraw from the team before the Churchill Cup tournament even began. The New Zealand Māori went on to take the title.

Air New Zealand Cup 
Lavea was again selected as Auckland's principal fly-half as the province prepared to defend its title.

Round One
During Auckland's opening Air New Zealand Cup match against Manawatu (Saturday 29 July 2006), nearly all players suffered sand burns from the appalling ground conditions at FMG Stadium, Palmerston North. It played a part in Lavea's first-half hamstring injury, thereby ruling him out of the playing 22 for Auckland's games against Tasman (Sunday 6 August 2006), Taranaki (Saturday 12 August 2006), and Bay of Plenty (Sunday 20 August 2006).

Lavea recovered to play the full 80 minutes for both the games against Wellington (Saturday 26 August 2006) and North Harbour (Friday 1 September 2006). In the "Battle of the Bridge" (Auckland vs North Harbour) Lavea performed admirably, kicking well to gain territory and making several significant runs.

Round Two
Lavea missed Auckland's first match in Round Two against Waikato (Saturday 16 September 2006) due to a calf injury.

Recovering from the minor injury in time to be named in the starting 15 for the match against Otago (Saturday 23 September 2006), Lavea controlled the game expertly. He found space with his kicking game, set up an impressive manoeuvre for Isaia Toeava, and ran in a great solo try off a deft intercept.

The Auckland fly-half also played solidly in the team's last Round Two match, against Canterbury (Saturday 30 September 2006). Auckland was denied a try in the very last play of the match which saw Lavea crash through the posts after a Doug Howlett offload. Controversially, referee Steve Walsh ruled that the pass was forward. Had Auckland been awarded that try, the result would have been a 27–27 draw, or a 29–27 win to Auckland if the conversion was successful. Both situations would have given Auckland the position of top seed going into the playoffs.

Quarter-finals
Auckland defeated Bay of Plenty for the second time this season in their quarter-final match-up on Saturday 7 October 2006. Lavea received a yellow card for a spear tackle at the start of the final quarter, but played the remainder of the match.

Semi-finals
Wellington defeated Auckland in the first 2006 Air New Zealand Cup semi-final on Friday 13 October 2006. Auckland's set-piece and handling errors meant Lavea could not get enough quality ball to capitalise on his team's expansive style of attack.

The Pacific Islanders squad 
In September 2006, Lavea was named in the Pacific Islanders rugby union team (representing Samoa) to tour the United Kingdom and Ireland in November 2006.

Although being named in the Pacific Islanders squad did not disqualify Lavea from playing for the All Blacks, the appearance of his name in the squad signified his possible allegiance to Manu Samoa in the future. At the time, Lavea stated that he felt it was time for him to take control of the future of his rugby career, and that opportunities lay with playing for the Pacific Islanders. If Lavea plays a test match for Manu Samoa, by IRB regulations he will become ineligible to play for the All Blacks.

In a further development, it is understood that Lavea's contract with the NZRU stipulates his availability for All Blacks selection. Even though recent All Blacks Sitiveni Sivivatu and Sione Lauaki both played for the Pacific Islanders and went on to get the black jersey, new PIRA rules seem to suggest that players can only be included in the Pacific Islanders squad if they declare allegiance to their respective Pacific Island national team (Fiji, Samoa or Tonga).

While the possibility of playing for Samoa in the 2007 Rugby World Cup would be of great appeal to Lavea, declaring himself unavailable for All Blacks selection could be detrimental to his rugby career in New Zealand (because a player that is not NZ-eligible is of less value to the NZRU). At the time Lavea did not comment on whether this would affect his decision to tour.

When the Pacific Islanders squad left for the UK on 2 November 2006, Lavea was not part of the squad. He withdrew from the team because Ian Foster, head coach of the Chiefs, requested for him to stay in New Zealand for pre-season training. Harbour fly-half Tusi Pisi was called in as Lavea's replacement in the touring squad, but Pisi's inclusion is understood not to have disqualified him for future All Blacks selection.

2007 Rugby season

Air New Zealand Cup 
Lavea's present contract with Auckland will end on 31 October 2007. He is currently playing for Auckland in the 2007 Air NZ Cup, at the conclusion of which he will begin a new 2-year contract with Counties Manukau. Since that places him in the Chiefs catchment area, he is directly eligible to play for them in the 2008 Super 14.

In early July 2007, Lavea travelled to Thailand for Auckland's pre-season training camp. However, due to an untimely hip flexor injury, he did not play until Week 9 of the 2007 Air NZ Cup season.

Week 9
Lavea played first five in Auckland's match against Otago on Friday 21 September 2007.

Super 14 
During the selection process for New Zealand's 2007 Super 14 teams, the Blues made Lavea available in the player draft, along with Auckland fullback Brent Ward and Harbour wing Viliame Waqaseduadua. The neighbouring Chiefs were glad to pick up Lavea for the coming season.

Chiefs head coach Ian Foster indicated the possibility of developing Lavea and Stephen Donald's roles in the team to create a 10/12 combination. Lavea was also enthusiastic about playing for a new team.

Pre-season
The Chiefs won 31–17 against the Hurricanes on Thursday 18 January 2007. Lavea was not initially named for this match because of a minor calf strain, but made a quick recovery and saw some game time in the second half.

Week 1
The first match of the Chiefs' 2007 Super 14 campaign was a home game against the Brumbies (Saturday 3 February 2007). Starting on the bench at No.21, Lavea substituted on at second five-eighths for Tane Tu'ipulotu in the final quarter.

Unfortunately, Lavea also injured his left knee in his Chiefs debut. MRI revealed a strained medial collateral ligament that was thought would keep him sidelined for at least six weeks.

Week 7
Lavea recovered from the knee injury after five weeks and resumed full contact training with the team during the build-up to the Chiefs' week 7 clash with the Lions (Friday 16 March 2007). He started the match at second five-eighths and shifted to first five-eighths for the final quarter. The Donald-Lavea five-eighth combination proved to be effective, with the former scoring a brace of tries in the Chiefs' 34 – 7 victory. Stephen Donald stated that having Lavea at second five-eighths allowed him to "have a crack", knowing that the next phase would be covered. Lavea made good use of tactical kicking throughout the match.

This was Lavea's first starting position with the Chiefs.

Week 8
Lavea remained at second five-eighths for the entire match against the Reds (Saturday 24 March 2007), which the Chiefs narrowly won 21 – 19. This victory has kept the Chiefs' semifinal hopes alive.

Week 9
The Chiefs played against the Blues on Saturday 31 March 2007. Lavea played at second five-eighths opposite old teammates Luke McAlister and Sam Tuitupou. Halfway through the first quarter, Lavea appeared to have aggravated his knee injury from Week 1. Ten minutes later he bounced back to score the Chiefs' only try of the match – his first try for the new team. However, the strain on his knee ruled out his selection for the Highlanders match in Queenstown on Saturday 7 April 2007.

Week 11
In the Chiefs' 64 – 36 victory over the Force (Saturday 14 April 2007), Lavea scored a try ten minutes into the second half from a Sitiveni Sivivatu offload. This bonus point win puts the Chiefs ahead of the Force in the race for a semifinal spot.

Week 12
The Chiefs defeated the Sharks 35 – 27 in their final round robin home game of the 2007 Super 14 (Saturday 21 April 2007). Lavea played both inside center and fly-half, scoring two tries in the first half of the match.

Week 13
Lavea was substituted after the first quarter of the away match against the Waratahs (Friday 27 April 2007) due to a foot injury. He suffered Achilles tendinopathy and a hematoma on his chest, missing the match against the Crusaders in the final week of round robin matchplay.

From 2009 with Clermont Auvergne 
Lavea signed for Clermont Auvergne in 2009. He mostly plays as a second choice at fly-half behind Brock James. He was called by Samoa national team for the first time in November 2010.

Statistics 
Super Rugby Caps: 26 (Blues 19, Chiefs 7)
Super Rugby Points: 50 (7 tries, 3 conversions, 3 penalties)Blues: 30 (3 tries, 3 conversions, 3 penalties)Chiefs: 20 (4 tries)

Blues Debut: 2004 vs Reds
Chiefs Debut: 2007 vs Brumbies

Provincial Caps: 35
Provincial Points: 35 (7 tries)

Auckland Debut: 2003 vs Waikato

Rugby League Test Caps: 4
Rugby League Test Points: 48 (3 tries, 18 goals)

See also 
2007 Air New Zealand Cup
Air New Zealand Cup
Auckland Rugby Football Union
2007 Super 14
Super Rugby
Chiefs
Blues
Pacific Islanders
rugby union

References

1980 births
Living people
ASM Clermont Auvergne players
Auckland rugby union players
Blues (Super Rugby) players
Chiefs (rugby union) players
Counties Manukau rugby union players
Expatriate rugby union players in England
Expatriate rugby union players in France
Manly Warringah Sea Eagles players
Māori All Blacks players
Melbourne Storm players
New Zealand sportspeople of Samoan descent
New Zealand Māori rugby league players
New Zealand rugby union players
New Zealand rugby league players
New Zealand expatriate rugby union players
New Zealand expatriate sportspeople in France
New Zealand expatriate sportspeople in Australia
New Zealand expatriate sportspeople in England
Northern Eagles players
New Zealand national rugby league team players
Pacific Islanders rugby union players
People from Taihape
People educated at Saint Kentigern College
People educated at Papatoetoe High School
Rugby league players from Manawatū-Whanganui
Rugby union fly-halves
Rugby union players from Manawatū-Whanganui
Sale Sharks players
Samoa international rugby union players
Samoan expatriate sportspeople in France